Martin Wyss is a former Swiss slalom canoeist who competed in the 1970s. He won two medals in the C-2 team event at the ICF Canoe Slalom World Championships with a silver in 1977 and a bronze in 1979.

References

External links 
 Martin WYSS at CanoeSlalom.net

Swiss male canoeists
Living people
Year of birth missing (living people)
Medalists at the ICF Canoe Slalom World Championships